The third season of Wildflower, a Philippine revenge drama television series on ABS-CBN, premiered on August 14, 2017 and concluded on December 1, 2017, with a total of 80 episodes.

Season three stars Maja Salvador, as Lily Cruz and Ivy Aguas, together with an ensemble cast consisting of Tirso Cruz III, Aiko Melendez, Sunshine Cruz, Wendell Ramos, Vin Abrenica, RK Bagatsing, and Joseph Marco.

Plot 
When Ivy reveals her real identity as Lily Cruz after she cripples the Ardiente's powerful influence, a new enemy surfaces. The enemy is Julio's first wife and Emilia's mother, Helena Montoya. Also known in the criminal world as Red Dragon, Helena controls the country’s largest crime syndicate operations. Notwithstanding the sinister résumé, Helena is no match to Ivy's cunning and superior skills, and after several conflicts, Lily brings Red Dragon's operations to a halt too.

Cast and characters

Main
Maja Salvador as Lily Cruz / Ivy P. Aguas
Tirso Cruz III as Julio Ardiente
Aiko Melendez as Emilia Ardiente-Torillo
Sunshine Cruz as Camia Delos Santos-Cruz
Wendell Ramos as Raul Torillo / Fake Jaguar
Vin Abrenica as Jepoy Madrigal
RK Bagatsing as Arnaldo Ardiente Torillo
Joseph Marco as Diego Torillo

Supporting
Christian Vasquez as Damian Cruz / Real Jaguar
Roxanne Barcelo as Natalie Alcantara
Malou de Guzman as Lorena "Loring" Cervantes
Bodjie Pascua as Leopando "Pandoy" Cervantes
Isay Alvarez-Seña as Clarita "Claire" De Guzman
Arnold Reyes as Arthur Vergara
Sheila Valderrama as Atty. Georgina Fisher
Yen Santos as Rosana "Ana" Navarro / Fake Lily Cruz
Miko Raval as Marlon Cabrera
Richard Quan as Col. Jose Sanggano
Bobby Andrews as Mateo Ruiz
Alma Concepcion as Divine Oytengco
Maika Rivera as Stefanie Oytengco
Mark Rafael Bringas as John Gonzalez
Biboy Ramirez as Jude Asuncion
Nina Ricci Alagao as Mercedes Palacio
Jun Urbano as Ramon Lim (North)
Bernard Laxa as Silverio Victoria (East)
Bong Regala as Carlos Isidro (West)
Matthew Mendoza as Oscar Evangelista (South)
Dawn Chang as Maila Lomeda / Ms. Moran
Jeffrey Santos as Col. Magbanua
Jong Cuenco as Judge Manuel Lustre
Michael Flores as NBI Agent Noel Salonga

Recurring
Raul Montessa as Fernan Naig
Vivo Ouano as Raul's ally
June Macasaet as Raul's ally
Prince De Guzman as Raul's ally
Angelo Ilagan as Raul's ally
Menggie Cobarubias as Atty. Sebastian
Justin Cuyugan as Mr. Paterno
Alex Castro as Rufo Cruz
Zeus Collins as Damian's ally
Luis Hontiveros as Damian's ally
Lito Pimentel as Cong. Ruel Cansiao
Richard Lopez
Alvin Nakassi
Vanessa Wright
Kris Janson

Guest
Juan Rodrigo as Ramon Montoya
Victor Silayan as Enrique
Christopher Roxas as Apollo
Matrica Mae Centino as Montona

Special guest
Zsa Zsa Padilla as Helena Montoya / Red Dragon
Patrick Garcia as Young Julio Ardiente
Emmanuelle Vera as Young Helena Montoya / Red Dragon

Episodes

References

External links

Wildflower (TV series)
2017 Philippine television seasons